Thode is a resort village in the Canadian province of Saskatchewan within Census Division No. 11. It is on the shores of Blackstrap Lake in the Rural Municipality of Dundurn No. 314. It is east of the town of Dundurn.

Sports and recreation
Thode is located on the western shore of Blackstrap Lake and has access to all the amenities of the lake, such as boating, fishing, swimming. Directly across the lake from Thode is Blackstrap Provincial Park, which features Mount Blackstrap, camping, hiking, picnicking, and various water activities. Also the lake across from Thode on the north-eastern shore is Lakeside Golf Resort, which opened June 1, 2021. Lakeside Golf Resort is directly across from Shields.

History

Thode incorporated as a resort village on January 1, 1981.

Demographics

Government
The Resort Village of Thode is governed by an elected municipal council and an appointed administrator that meets on the third Thursday of every month. The mayor is Alan Thomarat and its administrator is Jessie Williams.

See also
List of communities in Saskatchewan
List of municipalities in Saskatchewan
List of resort villages in Saskatchewan
List of villages in Saskatchewan
List of summer villages in Alberta

References

External links

Resort villages in Saskatchewan
Dundurn No. 314, Saskatchewan
Division No. 11, Saskatchewan